Eupalaestrus is a genus of South American tarantulas that was first described by Reginald Innes Pocock in 1901.

Species
 it contains six species, found in Uruguay, Argentina, Paraguay, and Brazil:
Eupalaestrus campestratus (Simon, 1891) (type) – Brazil, Paraguay, Argentina
Eupalaestrus crassimetatarsis Borges, Paladini & Bertani, 2021 – Brazil, Argentina
Eupalaestrus larae Ferretti & Barneche, 2012 – Argentina
Eupalaestrus roccoi Borges, Paladini & Bertani, 2021 – Brazil
Eupalaestrus spinosissimus Mello-Leitão, 1923 – Brazil
Eupalaestrus weijenberghi (Thorell, 1894) – Brazil, Uruguay, Argentina

In synonymy:
E. guyanus (Simon, 1892) = Eupalaestrus campestratus (Simon, 1891)
E. holophaeus (Mello-Leitão, 1923, removed from S of Vitalius cesteri (Mello-Leitão, 1923), contra Bücherl, 1947a: 258, sub Pamphobeteus) = Eupalaestrus spinosissimus Mello-Leitão, 1923
E. pugilator Pocock, 1901 = Eupalaestrus campestratus (Simon, 1891)
E. riparius (Schmidt & Bolle, 2008) = Eupalaestrus weijenberghi (Thorell, 1894)
E. saltator (Pocock, 1903) = Eupalaestrus weijenberghi (Thorell, 1894)
E. tarsicrassus Bücherl, 1947 = Eupalaestrus spinosissimus Mello-Leitão, 1923
E. tennuitarsus Bücherl, 1947 = Eupalaestrus campestratus (Simon, 1891)

See also
 List of Theraphosidae species

References

Theraphosidae genera
Spiders of South America
Taxa named by R. I. Pocock
Theraphosidae